Commodore Arthur Sinclair (28 February 1780 – 7 February 1831) was an early American naval hero, who served in the U.S. Navy during the Quasi-War with France, the First Barbary War and in the War of 1812.  His three sons also served in the Navy; they resigned in 1861, however, to serve in the Confederate Navy.

Early Naval Service
Born in Virginia, the youngest son of Arthur Sinclair I who had served in the Royal Navy during the War of Jenkin's Ear and the Continental Navy during the American Revolution, Sinclair entered the Navy as Midshipman in 1798. He served as Midshipman in Constellation during the capture of the French frigate L'Insurgente on 9 February 1799. He was attached to the Mediterranean Squadron from June 1804 to July 1806, participating in the attacks on Tripoli on board Essex.  He then sailed Gunboat No. 10 to the United States.

War of 1812

Raiding British shipping on Argus
On 10 June 1807 he was promoted to the rank of Lieutenant.  On 13 December 1811, he was ordered to the command of Argus; and, between 12 October and 17 December 1812, cruised in Argus with the North Atlantic Squadron and took a number of prizes. During the cruise, he became separated from the squadron and was chased for three days and nights by an enemy squadron before his superior ship handling enabled him to escape.

Raid at St. Mary River
For much of the War of 1812, Sinclair was assigned to the Great Lakes as part of Commodore Isaac Chauncey's squadron, where he commanded the warship General Pike in an engagement on Lake Ontario on 28 September 1813. For his valor during another engagement on Lake Erie in 1813, Sinclair received a presentation sword from the Commonwealth of Virginia (now in the Virginia Historical Society's collection). In 1814, he commanded Niagara on Lake Huron and Lake Superior and directed the naval squadron in the Battle of Mackinac Island and the Engagement on Lake Huron. Sinclair conducted a hit-and-run raid at St. Mary River, Upper Canada capturing a small merchantman, the Mink. After capturing the merchantman in the raid, Arthur Sinclair withdrew back to American lines in Michilimackinac.

Extension of Sinclair’s Raid
In extension of his raid at St. Mary River. Sinclair sent Turner with a detachment of seamen alongside regulars under Andrew Holmes to penetrate deeper into enemy territory. Turner destroyed buildings, possessions, and burned a schooner. Turner withdrew back to American territory in Michilimackinac reuniting with Arthur Sinclair.

Raid at St. Joseph Island
On July 12, 1814. Arthur Sinclair commanding 5 vessels transported 550 American regulars and 250 militia led by Lt. Colonel George Croghan who was the hero of Fort Stephenson. Sinclair sailed his force to St. Joseph Island where the British abandoned their outpost. Sinclair landed the American infantry force, and the Americans found a British vessel that had been set on fire by the British who evacuated. The Americans put the fire out to salvage the ship. But after examining the ship, the Americans restarted the fire and destroyed the ship. The Americans also burned the empty British post and also burned down the Canadian Northwest Company trading post. Then the Americans boarded the ships of Sinclair’s fleet and departed to their next objective.

Raid at Mackinac Island
On August 4, 1814. Arthur Sinclair moved his fleet to Mackinac Island that was under British occupation. The objective of the American fleet was to retake Mackinac Island. Sinclair steered his fleet to Mackinac. Sinclair lands the American infantry on the rear of the British post on the island. Lt. Col George Croghan advanced with his regulars and militia. But the British had set a position to resist the American advance. Croghan’s regulars were ambushed by Indians allied to the British. The Americans engaged the British-Indian force. The Americans suffered 13 killed and 52 wounded. The British-Indian forces suffered maybe 1 killed and 1 wounded. The Americans gave up their objective after suffering heavy casualties and retreated to the ships of Sinclair’s fleet. Arthur Sinclair’s fleet withdrew from the Island.

Raid at Nottawasaga
	Arthur Sinclair steered his fleet to raid Nottawasaga. On August 13, 1814, Sinclair sent his two vessels Lawrence and Caledonia back to Detroit. Then Sinclair moved on with his 3 remaining vessels Niagara,  Scorpion and Tigress to Nottawasaga to attack a British outpost. Sinclair arrived at the location and landed infantry troops with artillery. The American land artillery and Sinclair’s cannons on his ships bombarded the British blockhouse. The British sailors and militia realizing they could not hold off the American assault any longer burned their schooner Nancy and blew up their blockhouse before retreating suffering 1 killed and 1 wounded. The Americans recovered the guns in the destroyed blockhouse and placed them on their ships. The American then felled trees across the river to block it. Sinclair left two gunboats to blockade the area under the command of  Lieutenant Daniel Turner. Sinclair instructed Turner to intercept any British supply shipping and then return back to Detroit when the weather turned bad. Arthur Sinclair withdrew back to Detroit in his vessel Niagara with the three newly captured British guns. Daniel Turner patrolled the area with his two gunboats. But the British sailors, militia, and Native American allies under Miller Worsley removed the tree abatis obstacles and stealthily snuck on the American gunboats and ambushed them. The Americans under Daniel Turner were all captured suffering 6 killed and 6 wounded. The victorious British suffered 3 killed and 9 wounded.

Promotion
Promoted to Captain in 1813, he commanded the frigate Congress in 1817; commanded the 74-gun ship of the line Washington in 1818. In 1819, he rose to the rank of Commodore and was placed in command of the Norfolk Navy Yard. It was while there, that he conceived the idea of a Nautical School and was allowed to set one up on board the frigate Guerriere, for the education and development of young naval officers. It was from that small start that the current U.S. Naval Academy at Annapolis has grown.

Commodore Sinclair died at Norfolk, Virginia on 7 February 1831.

Family
The family originated from the Shetland Islands off Scotland and were reputedly distant relations of Scottish royalty. The first Arthur Sinclair, of Scalloway, in Shetland, sailed with Commodore George Anson in 1740, on a mission to capture Spanish possessions in the Pacific, during Britain's war with Spain. The mission lasted for four years and resulted in the little fleet circumnavigating the world. Loss of life was horrendous, with only 188 of the original 1,854 men surviving to make it back to England.

Arthur Sinclair I left the expedition when they reached America and eventually settled in Norfolk, Virginia, where he made claim to a large tract of land, and became a sea captain sailing between Virginia and England. After the death of his first wife he married Susanna Phillips of Halifax County, in Middlesex County on 22 February 1766 at the age of 59. Their son, Arthur II, was born in 1780. During the War of American Independence (1775-1783) Sinclair served in the Continental Navy, fighting against his old countrymen. He retired to Cobham in  Surry County where he died in 1791 at age 84. 

Arthur Sinclair II married first, Elizabeth, daughter of General John Hartwell Cocke, of Mt Pleasant, in Surry County. They had two children, twins, Robert Carter Nicholas d 1806 and Augusta (died 3 weeks after birth) Mar 1802. These children died young and their mother died in 1803.

Arthur Sinclair II married second on 20 Jan 1810 in Halifax County, Sarah (Sally) Short Skipwith Kennon (30 Oct 1790 - 21 August 1827), daughter of Colonel Richard Kennon of Conjurer's Neck, Chesterfield County.

Arthur and Sally had seven children:

1. Arthur Sinclair (29 Nov 1810 - 14 Jan 1865), Commander USN, CSN, served on the CSS Alabama, married, 20 Apr 1835, Lelia Imogene Dawley of Norfolk.

2. Elizabeth Beverly Sinclair Whittle (26 Jul 1812 - 1855), married Captain William Conway Whittle, USN, CSN

3. Richard Kennon Sinclair (8 Nov 1814-7 Jul 1815)

4. George Tarry Sinclair (29 Sep 1816 - 25 Jul 1885) LT USN, CSN  2 May 1843, Mary Thompson (5 Jan 1825 - 6 Nov 1888)

5. Dr. William Beverly Sinclair (22 Jan 1818 - 27 Sep 1895), surgeon, USN, CSN, a prominent physician, married 11 Nov 1844, Lucy Franklin Read Jones

6. Sarah Sinclair (22 Jul 1820), died in infancy

7. Gilberta Fayette Sinclair (19 Oct 1824 - 27 Apr 1906), married Dr. Conway Davies Whittle, of Norfolk.

Arthur Sinclair II was the great-grandfather of novelist Upton Sinclair, author of the novel The Jungle (1906). He was also the second great-grandfather of Vice Admiral Lloyd M. Mustin and third great-grandfather of Vice Admiral Henry C. "Hank" Mustin and the fourth great-grandfather of Vice Admiral John Mustin.

Namesake
The destroyer USS Sinclair (DD-275) was named for him.

See also

References

Sinclair, Upton.  The Autobiography of Upton Sinclair.  New York: Harcourt, Brace & World, Inc., 1962.

1780 births
1831 deaths
United States Navy officers
American military personnel of the Quasi-War
American military personnel of the First Barbary War
United States Navy personnel of the War of 1812
People from Virginia